The Tarqui River is a river located primarily in the Azuay Province of Ecuador.  Its path begins near the town of Paute, and ends shortly after passing the city of Cuenca, which is located on the north bank of the river.

See also
List of rivers of Ecuador

References

 Rand McNally, The New International Atlas, 1993.
  GEOnet Names Server
 Water Resources Assessment of Ecuador

Rivers of Ecuador